Gabriola dyari, or Dyar's looper, is a moth of the family Geometridae first described by Taylor in 1904. It is found from the Alaskan panhandle and British Columbia to California. The habitat consists of coniferous forests.

The wingspan is 25–30 mm. The forewings are brownish gray with black speckling and lines. The hindwings are uniformly brownish gray except for a dark thin terminal line. There is one generation per year with adults on wing from June to October in California.

The larvae feed on the foliage of various coniferous trees, including Tsuga heterophylla, Tsuga mertensiana, Pseudotsuga, Thuja plicata, Abies amabilis, Abies grandis, Abies lasiocarpa and Picea engelmannii. They have a rusty brown to gray body with white dorsal patches and a light tan head with reddish-brown mottling. They reach a length of up to 20 mm. When at rest, the larva resembles a bird dropping. Larvae can be found from May to July. The species overwinters as an egg. Pupation takes place in a cocoon on a twig in August.

References

Moths described in 1904
Nacophorini